Jawaharlal Amolakchand Darda (2 July 1923 – 25 November 1997), known popularly as  Babuji, was an Indian freedom fighter and a senior Indian National Congress politician. He was the founding editor of Lokmat group of newspapers (now Lokmat Media). He was a pioneering journalist and a prominent politician of his time.

Career 
Darda began as a social worker and then, inspired by Mahatma Gandhi, participated in the Satyagraha Movement in 1942 and joined the Quit India Movement, for which he was sentenced to jail for one year and 9 months. While in Jabalpur Jail he organized a youth conference on 10 August 1942. In 1944 he created Azad Hind Sena at Yavatmal. In 1973 he represented the Government of India at Copenhagen (Denmark) at an International Conference on Housing.

Awards and achievements 
On 12 September 2013, Jawaharlal Darda was posthumously conferred the Lifetime Achievement Award at UK's House of Commons.
Yavatmal Airport is known as Jawaharlal Darda Airport.
APMC Yavatmal is known as Jawaharlal Darda Market Yard.
He set up the first college Amolakchand Mahavidyalaya at Yavatmal in 1956.
Jawaharlal Darda Institute of Engineering and Technology, Yavatmal.
Jawaharlal Darda English Medium School & Jr. College, Yavatmal.
Jawaharlal Darda Sangeet Kala Academy, Lokmat Bhavan, Nagpur.
Veenadevi Darda School, Yavatmal is a new-age school floated by Shri Jawaharlal Darda Education Society.
Yavatmal Public School, Yavatmal Started in April 2006 the first CBSE school in Yavatmal.

References 

Indian politicians
Indian independence activists
1923 births

1997 deaths